Thomas Muster was the defending champion, but did not compete this year.

Alberto Berasategui won the title by defeating Karol Kučera 6–2, 6–4 in the final.

Seeds

Draw

Finals

Top half

Bottom half

References

External links
 Official results archive (ATP)
 Official results archive (ITF)

Croatia Open Umag - Singles
1994 Singles
1994 in Croatian tennis